Thomas Horan (7 April 1886 – 26 May 1952) was an Australian cricketer. He played five first-class cricket matches for Victoria between 1906 and 1909.

See also
 List of Victoria first-class cricketers

References

External links
 

1886 births
1952 deaths
Australian cricketers
Victoria cricketers
Cricketers from Melbourne
Australian people of Irish descent